Terrie Wood (born Lakewood, Ohio) is an American politician who serves as a member of the Connecticut House of Representatives, representing Darien and Rowayton, Connecticut in the 141st assembly district. She had run unopposed in her first two elections, but faced Democrat Rob Werner for her third.

Wood is a graduate of Rollins College. She had previously been a member of the Darien Town Meeting and president of the Darien Land Trust. She is the co-founder of The Darien Environmental Group. Wood is a Republican.

References 

Living people
Republican Party members of the Connecticut House of Representatives
People from Darien, Connecticut
People from Lakewood, Ohio
Rollins College alumni
Women state legislators in Connecticut
21st-century American politicians
21st-century American women politicians
Year of birth missing (living people)